The following squads were named for the 1920 Summer Olympics tournament.

Head coach: Raoul Daufresne de la Chevalerie

Head coach: Josef Fanta

Head coach: Jack Carr

NOTE: The Egyptian Football Association was established in 1921, so this squad can not be considered a proper national team, but rather an Egyptian Select XI.

Head coach:

Head coach:  Fred Pentland

Maurice Gastiger and Pierre Gastiger - two brothers

Head coach: George Latham

Head coach: Georgios Kalafatis

Head coach: Giuseppe Milano

Head coach:

Head coach:  Frederick Warburton

Head coach:  James McPherson

The following players were also named as reserves, but did not play in any matches: Kaare Engebretsen, Erich Graff-Wang and Alexander Olsen

Head coach: Francisco Bru

Sweden
Head coach: Anton Johanson

The following players were also named as reserves, but did not play in any matches: Fritz Carlsson, Erik Dahlström, Einar Halling-Johansson, Erik Hjelm, Nils Karlsson, Sven Klang, Vidar Stenborg, Henning Svensson, John Torstensson and Rune Wenzel.

Head coach: Veljko Ugrinić

The following players were also named as reserves, but did not play in any matches: Branko Jopantević, Jovan Pojić and Nikola Stanković

References

External links
 FIFA
 RSSSF
 List of Luxembourgian olympic footballers at ALO
 Match report at FFF
 Match report at FFF
 Match report at Serbian football federation
 Match report at Serbian football federation
 Denmark squad at DBU 
 Greece - International Matches 1929-1938, Alexander Mastrogiannopoulos, RSSSF
 Great Britain team at British Olympic Association 
 Mezinárodní zápasy na‰í reprezentace 1906–2004, ATLAS ČESKÉHO FOTBALU
 List of Norway international footballers
 The Times release of 19 August 1920 
 Historia de la Seleccion española
 FIFA Information Services(page 41)- Gold medal winners Olympic Football Tournament
 Oranje Statistics, Olympics 1920

1920 Summer Olympics
Football at the 1920 Summer Olympics